The Monmouth Heritage Trail is a walking route which connects various sights in the town of Monmouth, Wales.

History
In 2009 Monmouth Civic Society identified 24 historic and interesting buildings in the town, and organised the production and fixing of ceramic blue plaques to them.  The plaques were made by Ned Heywood of Chepstow, with a stoneware body and raised text in both English and Welsh, set off by a blue glaze.  The space for text was limited, and each plaque contained a brief summary of the importance of the building to the town. Some choices were obvious, such as the Monnow Bridge and Shire Hall, both symbols of the town and listed buildings. Others were less well known, such as The Nelson Garden or Monmouth Methodist Church, even though townspeople passed them every day. The map and list of Blue Plaque buildings is shown below.

The guide information is available in Welsh, but a larger number of languages are available in Wikipedia. The "MonmouthpediA" project provides visitors with information about all aspects of the town via QRpedia QR codes.

Key

The buildings

References

External links
 Timeline of the Monmouth Heritage Trail on Histropedia

History of Monmouthshire
Blue plaques
Buildings and structures in Monmouth, Wales
Urban heritage trails
Tourist attractions in Monmouthshire